Hardberg may refer to:

 Hardberg (Odenwald), a hill in the Odenwald range in Hesse, Germany
 Hardberg (Schwarzwald), a mountain of Baden-Württemberg, Germany